Bruno Fraga Soares (born 27 February 1982) is a Brazilian former professional tennis player who specialises in doubles.

A doubles specialist, Soares won six major titles, the Australian Open and US Open in 2016 alongside Jamie Murray, and the 2020 US Open with Mate Pavić in men's doubles. In mixed doubles, Soares won the 2012 US Open partnering Ekaterina Makarova, the 2014 US Open with Sania Mirza, and the 2016 Australian Open with Elena Vesnina. He also finished runner-up at the 2013 US Open and 2020 French Open in men's doubles, and the 2013 Wimbledon Championships in mixed doubles. Soares was the fourth Brazilian to win a major title in any discipline, following Maria Bueno, Thomaz Koch and Gustavo Kuerten.

He reached his career-high doubles ranking of world No. 2 in October 2016, and has won 35 titles on the ATP Tour, including four at Masters 1000 level. Soares was part of the ATP Doubles Team of the year in both 2016 and 2020. In singles, his highest ranking was world No. 221, achieved in March 2004. Soares has represented Brazil in the Davis Cup since 2005, and competed at the 2012 and 2016 Olympic Games.

Professional career

2008: First ATP title
In early 2008, Soares won the São Paulo Challenger for the second time, rising in the doubles rankings and gaining the opportunity to compete in the main tournament circuit, the ATP tours. In 2008, Soares had a great campaign. Playing without a permanent partner, he reached the semifinals of Roland Garros and the quarter-finals of the US Open.

In addition, he won his first ATP doubles title in Nottingham, a grass tournament before Wimbledon.

Helped by the winnings of the French Open, Soares decided to finish 2008 marrying architect Bruna Alvim. The couple welcomed their first son, Noah, in 2015.

2009
In 2009, Soares partnered with Kevin Ullyett from Zimbabwe, a high level doubles player who had won 32 titles and remained ranked among the top 10 for several years. They reached the quarterfinals of Wimbledon and Roland Garros, the semifinals of the Masters 1000 Rome and Madrid, the final of the ATP New Haven, and won his second ATP doubles title in Stockholm. At the end of the year, with the retirement of Ullyett, Soares announced a new partnership with Marcelo Melo.

2010
In 2010, Melo and Soares reached the final of the ATP 250 Auckland at the beginning of the year. In May, they won the title of the ATP 250 Nice. In Roland Garros, Soares defeated the brothers Bob Bryan and Mike Bryanthe world's top doubles playersand reached the quarterfinals. Subsequently, Soares and Melo reached the semifinals of the ATP 500 Hamburg, the final of the ATP 250 Gstaad, the third round of the US Open, the final of the ATP 250 Metz, and the semifinals of the ATP 500 Tokyo and the ATP 250 Stockholm.

2011
In 2011 at the South American Clay tournamentsa series of four ATP tournaments in Latin AmericaMelo and Soares won two consecutive titles in the ATP 250 of Chile and Brazil, and were runners-up at the ATP 500 Acapulco. In April, Soares was runner-up of the Masters 1000 Monte Carlo, playing alongside Juan Ignacio Chela. He competed in the semifinals of the ATPs 250s in Nice and Eastbourne. In August, the Melo and Soares arrived at the semifinals of the ATP 500 Washington. In October, with Soares and Melo reached the semifinals of the ATP 500 Valencia and Tokyo, and the final of the ATP 250 Stockholm. Partnered with Nicolas Almagro he was a quarterfinalist in the Masters 1000 Shanghai. In November, Soares and Melo were quarterfinalists in the Masters 1000 Paris. At the end of the year, Melo and Soares ended their partnership.

2012
Soares partnered with Eric Butorac and went to the quarterfinals of the Australian Open and won his sixth ATP doubles title in the ATP 250 Brazil. He also reached the third round at Roland Garros.

On July, he ended his partnership with Butorac and began playing with Alexander Peya. In the first tournament of the new partnership, they were runners-up of the ATP 250 Bastad.

Participating at the London Olympics with Marcelo Melo, Soares reached the quarterfinals after defeating the duo Berdych/Stepanek by 24–22 in the last set.

At the US Open along with Peya, Soares reached the quarterfinals of the men's doubles. In that tournament, partnering with Ekaterina Makarova, Soares won the biggest title of his career thus far by becoming mixed-doubles champion. In the first round, they defeated the seeded No. 2 couple Mike Bryan and Lisa Raymond. In the second phase, they defeated Bob Bryan and Kim Clijsters. Since Gustavo Kuerten's 3rd Roland Garros victory in 2001, a Brazilian had not won a Grand Slam title. Soares/Makarova won $150,000 as a prize for the title.

After the mixed doubles title at the US Open, Soares took an impressive winning streak, winning the doubles match of the Davis Cup in Brazil against Russia and won four titles in five consecutive tournaments played. He won the ATP 250 Kuala Lumpur and the ATP 500 Tokyo, both playing with Peya; they played the Masters 1000 Shanghai but lost in the second round. Partnered with Melo he won the ATP 250 Stockholm, and the ATP 500 Valencia playing with Peya. In the Masters 1000 Paris, Soares and Peya were quarterfinalists.

2013

2013 was the best year in the Soares' career. In January, he won the ATP 250 Auckland, alongside Scottish Colin Fleming. In February, partnered with Melo, he defeated the Bryan brothers at the Davis Cup in the United States. In the same month, he and Peya won the ATP 250 BrasilSoares' third win in that tournament and reached the semifinals of the ATP 500 in Memphis and Acapulco.

In March, Soares reached the semifinals of the Masters 1000 Indian Wells. In April, he won the ATP 500 Barcelona. In May, for the second time in his career, he was runner-up of a Masters 1000 in Madrid, losing only to the world leaders the Bryan brothers. At this point, Soares approached the top 10 doubles, staying at 11th place. In Roland Garros, Soares and Peya reached the semifinals of the tournament. With that, Soares entered the top 10, ranking sixth for doubles. Soares equaled Carlos Kirmayr's No. 6 in the world in 1983 as the second-best doubles tennis player in Brazil's history.

In preparation for Wimbledon, Soares was runner-up in the ATP 250 Queens and champion of the ATP 250 Eastbourne, reaching its 200th victory. At Wimbledon, Soares was knocked out in the third round of the men's doubles. In mixed doubles, Soares reached the final of the tournament for the first time, partnered with the American Lisa Raymond. He was runner-up at the ATP 500 Hamburg in July. In August, Soares and Peya won a Masters-1000 title for the first time at the Canadian Open. With that, Soares arrived at the best doubles ranking of his career, No. 4 in the world, equaling Cássio Motta as the best Brazilian doubles player of all time.

At the US Open, Soares "retired" James Blake in the first round of the men's doubles. In mixed doubles, Soares reached the semifinals partnered with Anabel Medina Garrigues. In men's doublesfor the first time in his careerhe reached a Grand Slam final. However, Peya suffered a muscle strain near the end of the semifinals game against Melo and Dodig. In the US Open final, Soares could not play well because of the problem, and in the second set, Peya almost abandoned the game. Soares and Peya eventually lost the final in two sets. With these results, Soares qualified in anticipation for the ATP Finals for the first time in his career.

On 7 October 2013, Soares became the No. 3 doubles player in the world; his best position of his career and the best position in the history of Brazilian tennissurpassing Cassio Motta, who was No. 4 doubles in 1983. At the end of October, Soares and Peya became two-time champions of the ATP 500 Valencia, defeating the Bryan brothers in the final.

2014
In 2014, the Soares/Peya partnership was beginning not to work as before. During the year, they had as prominent campaigns only the title of the Masters 1000 in Canada and one runner-up finish at the Masters 1000 Indian Wells, as well as a title in the ATP 250 in London. Soares finished the year as No. 10 in the world.

2015
The partnership did not work well. Just as in 2014, they obtained only two quarterfinals in Grand Slam events, and the result in the Masters 1000 has worsened, with the pair getting only two semifinals in Miami and Canada. Soares finished the year as No. 22 in the world.
In October, Soares announced the ending of his partnership with Alexander Peya, and a new partnership with Britain's Jamie Murray in the 2016 season.

2016

The Soares and Murray partnership had an astonishing start. They reached the semifinals of the Doha ATP Tour 250, the first tournament of the season. On 16 January, Soares and Murray won the second tournament of the season, the Sydney ATP Tour 250. On January 30, the duo won the Australian Open. It was Soares' first Grand Slam title in men's doubles. Murray/Soares defeated the team of the Czech Radek Štěpánek and the Canadian Daniel Nestor in three sets in the men's doubles final. Soares partnered with Elena Vesnina in the mixed doubles and reached the final, where they overcame Horia Tecău and CoCo Vandeweghe in three sets. Soares became the first Brazilian man to win two titles in the same Grand Slam.

Soares and Murray would combine to also win the US Open men's doubles title in 2016. Soares ended the season at No. 1 in the ATP doubles race alongside Murray.

2017
In the new season, the Soares/Murray duo dropped a little income, not obtaining any Grand Slam or Masters 1000 titles. Their best results in these tournaments were the runner-up of the Masters 1000 of Cincinnati, the semifinals of the Masters 1000 of Indian Wells, Shanghai and Paris, and the quarterfinals of Roland Garros and the US Open. They won the ATP 500 from Acapulco, Queens, and the ATP 250 from Stuttgart. Thus, Soares ended the year as No. 10 in the world in doubles.

2018
Soares obtains as his biggest title the Masters 1000 of Cincinnati. He was also runner-up in the Shanghai Masters 1000, and a semifinalist in Rome and got quarterfinals at Wimbledon and the US Open. He became twice champion of the ATP 500 in Acapulco, won the ATP 500 in Washington, and was runner-up in the ATP 500 in Queens. The year ended as No. 7 in the world in doubles.

2019
In January, Soares and partner Jamie Murray reached the quarterfinal at the Australian Open, but were defeated in straight sets. In May, they ended their three and a half year partnership after a first-round loss at the French Open. Soares announced 2018 Australian Open and 2018 Davis Cup winner, Croatian Mate Pavić, as his new partner.

His biggest title of the year was winning the Masters 1000 in Shanghai, playing with Pavic. He also won the Sydney ATP 250 with Murray, and the ATP 250 Stuttgart playing with John Peers. During a difficult year, he was still a semifinalist at the Masters 1000 in Monte Carlo and Cincinnati, made the quarterfinals at the Australian Open and was runner-up in the ATP 500 in Barcelona. He ended the year outside the top 10, which had not happened since 2015, as No. 21 in the world.

2021
At the US Open, Soares, partnering with Jamie Murray, reached the final for the fourth time in his career, defeating Filip Polášek and John Peers in the semifinals.

2022: Retirement 
He played his last match at the 2022 US Open (tennis) with Jamie Murray.

Significant finals

Grand Slam finals

Doubles: 6 (3  titles, 3 runner-ups)

Mixed doubles: 4 (3 titles, 1 runner-up)

Masters 1000 finals

Doubles: 13 (4 titles, 9 runner-ups)

ATP career finals

Doubles: 69 (35 titles, 34 runner-ups)

Performance timelines

Doubles
Current through the 2022 Davis Cup.

Mixed doubles

References

External links

 
 
 

1982 births
Living people
Brazilian male tennis players
Sportspeople from Belo Horizonte
Tennis players at the 2012 Summer Olympics
Tennis players at the 2016 Summer Olympics
Olympic tennis players of Brazil
Grand Slam (tennis) champions in men's doubles
Grand Slam (tennis) champions in mixed doubles
Australian Open (tennis) champions
US Open (tennis) champions
ITF World Champions